McCubbin is a surname. Notable people with the surname include:

Bobby McCubbin (1868–1950), Australian rules footballer
Frederick McCubbin (1855–1917), Australian painter
Henry McCubbin (born 1942), Scottish politician
Robert McCubbin (1902–1975), Canadian politician
Russ McCubbin (born 1935), American actor
Sandy McCubbin (1886-?), Scottish footballer

See also
McCubbins